Sing Me a Lullaby, My Sweet Temptation is the third studio album by American hip hop duo $uicideboy$. It was released on July 29, 2022 via G*59 Records. Production was handled by member Budd Dwyer. The album was preceded by two singles: "The Evil That Men Do" and "Escape from Babylon". The latter reached No. 122 on the US Billboard Hot 100.

In the United States, the album peaked at number seven on the Billboard 200, number two on both the Top R&B/Hip-Hop Albums and Independent Albums, and topped the Top Rap Albums chart. It also reached number six in New Zealand, number fourteen in Finland, and number twenty-six in Australia and Canada.

Track listing

Charts

Weekly charts

Year-end charts

References

External links

2022 albums
Suicideboys albums